Schalke 04 had one of its best ever seasons, winning the German Cup. They almost won the league too, hindered only by a late Patrik Andersson free kick for Bayern Munich in stoppage time against Hamburg. Nonetheless, Schalke still qualified for the Champions League for the first time.

Players

First-team squad
Squad at end of season

Left club during season

Competitions

Bundesliga

League table

Results by Round

Matches
 Schalke 04–Köln 2–1
 1–0 Ebbe Sand 
 2–0 Émile Mpenza 
 2–1 Tomasz Hajto 
 Hansa Rostock-Schalke 04 0–4
 0–1 Émile Mpenza 
 0–2 Émile Mpenza 
 0–3 Ebbe Sand 
 0–4 Émile Mpenza 
 Schalke 04-Energie Cottbus 3–0
 1–0 Ebbe Sand 
 2–0 Ebbe Sand 
 3–0 Ebbe Sand 
 1860 Munich-Schalke 04 1–1
 0–1 Émile Mpenza 
 1–1 Markus Beierle 
 Schalke 04-Werder Bremen 1–1
 0–1 Aílton 
 1–1 Jörg Böhme 
 Borussia Dortmund-Schalke 04 0–4
 0–1 Jörg Böhme 
 0–2 Émile Mpenza 
 0–3 Jörg Heinrich 
 0–4 Ebbe Sand 
 Hamburg-Schalke 04 2–0
 1–0 Marek Heinz 
 2–0 Mehdi Mahdavikia 
 Schalke 04-Eintracht Frankfurt 4–0
 1–0 Jörg Böhme 
 2–0 Radoslav Latal 
 3–0 Jörg Böhme 
 4–0 Markus Happe 
 Freiburg-Schalke 04 3–1
 1–0 Andreas Zeyer 
 1–1 Tomasz Wałdoch 
 2–1 Adel Sellimi 
 3–1 Abder Ramdane 
 Schalke 04-Bayer Leverkusen 0–0
 Kaiserslautern-Schalke 04 3–2
 0–1 Ebbe Sand 
 0–2 Tomasz Wałdoch 
 1–2 Harry Koch 
 2–2 Miroslav Klose 
 3–2 Olaf Marschall 
 Schalke 04-Bayern Munich 3–2
 0–1 Giovane Élber 
 1–1 Andreas Möller 
 1–2 Paulo Sérgio 
 2–2 Gerald Asamoah 
 3–2 Ebbe Sand 
 Hertha Berlin-Schalke 04 0–4
 0–1 Ebbe Sand 
 0–2 Ebbe Sand 
 0–3 Jörg Böhme 
 0–4 Ebbe Sand 
 Schalke 04-Bochum 2–1
 1–0 Youri Mulder 
 1–1 Marijo Marić 
 2–1 Ebbe Sand 
 Wolfsburg-Schalke 04 2–0
 1–0 Claus Thomsen 
 2–0 Charles Akonnor 
 Schalke 04-Stuttgart 2–1
 1–0 Radoslav Latal 
 1–1 Ioan Ganea 
 2–1 Tomasz Wałdoch 
 Unterhaching-Schalke 04 0–2
 0–1 Ebbe Sand 
 0–2 Marco van Hoogdalem 
 Köln-Schalke 04 2–2
 0–1 Jörg Böhme 
 0–2 Gerald Asamoah 
 1–2 Georgi Donkov 
 2–2 Carsten Cullmann 
 Schalke 04-Hansa Rostock 2–0
 1–0 Jörg Böhme 
 2–0 Jiří Němec 
 Energie Cottbus-Schalke 04 4–1
 1–0 Vasile Miriuță 
 2–0 Sebastian Helbig 
 2–1 Ebbe Sand 
 3–1 Andrzej Kobylański 
 4–1 Antun Labak 
 Schalke 04-1860 Munich 2–0
 1–0 Émile Mpenza 
 2–0 Émile Mpenza 
 Werder Bremen-Schalke 04 2–1
 1–0 Claudio Pizarro 
 2–0 Fabian Ernst 
 2–1 Ebbe Sand 
 Schalke 04-Borussia Dortmund 0–0
 Schalke 04-Hamburg 0–1
 0–1 Erik Meijer 
 Eintracht Frankfurt-Schalke 04 0–0
 Schalke 04-Freiburg 0–0
 Bayer Leverkusen-Schalke 04 0–3
 0–1 Boris Živković 
 0–2 Émile Mpenza 
 0–3 Gerald Asamoah 
 Schalke 04–Kaiserslautern 5–1
 1–0 Tomasz Wałdoch 
 2–0 Tomasz Wałdoch 
 3–0 Ebbe Sand 
 3–1 Miroslav Klose 
 4–1 Émile Mpenza 
 5–1 Ebbe Sand 
 Bayern Munich-Schalke 04 1–3
 1–0 Carsten Jancker 
 1–1 Ebbe Sand 
 1–2 Ebbe Sand 
 1–3 Ebbe Sand 
 Schalke 04-Hertha Berlin 3–1
 0–1 Sebastian Deisler 
 1–1 Marco van Hoogdalem 
 2–1 Émile Mpenza 
 Bochum-Schalke 04 1–1
 1–0 Paul Freier 
 1–1 Émile Mpenza 
 Schalke 04-Wolfsburg 2–1
 1–0 Ebbe Sand 
 2–0 Émile Mpenza 
 2–1 Andrzej Juskowiak 
 Stuttgart-Schalke 04 1–0
 1–0 Krassimir Balakov 
 Schalke 04-Unterhaching 5–3
 0–1 André Breitenreiter 
 0–2 Mirosław Spiżak 
 1–2 Nico van Kerckhoven 
 2–2 Gerald Asamoah 
 2–3 Jan Seifert 
 3–3 Jörg Böhme 
 4–3 Jörg Böhme 
 5–3 Ebbe Sand

Statistics

Top scorers

Bundesliga
  Ebbe Sand 22
  Émile Mpenza 13
  Jörg Böhme 9
  Tomasz Wałdoch 5

Transfers

In
 Andreas Möller - Borussia Dortmund
 Tomasz Hajto - MSV Duisburg
 Jörg Böhme - Arminia Bielefeld

Out
 Andreas Müller - retired

References

Notes

FC Schalke 04 seasons
Schalke 04